Henning Christian Gottfrid Müller (4 November 1896 – 6 May 1980) was a Swedish tennis player who competed in singles and doubles at the 1920 and 1924 Olympics. He had his best results in the doubles, finishing ninth in 1920, with Olle Andersson, and fifth in 1924, with Charles Wennergren and Sigrid Fick.

At the 1927 Wimbledon Championships he lost in the first round of the singles event to Craig Campbell.

References

External links
 
 

1896 births
1980 deaths
Swedish male tennis players
Olympic tennis players of Sweden
Tennis players at the 1920 Summer Olympics
Tennis players at the 1924 Summer Olympics